Hidden River is a tributary of Spruce Creek in Larimer County, Colorado.  The stream's source is near the summit of Stones Peak in Rocky Mountain National Park. It flows southeast to a confluence with Spruce Creek in Spruce Canyon.

See also
 List of rivers of Colorado

References

Rivers of Rocky Mountain National Park
Rivers of Larimer County, Colorado
Tributaries of the Platte River